Cydia parapteryx is a moth of the family Tortricidae. It was first described by Edward Meyrick in 1932. It is endemic to the Hawaiian island of Oahu.

The larvae feed on the seeds, stems and possibly the flowers of Canavalia species and Strongylodon ruber. Young larvae bore into the pod, and when it gets larger it attacks the seeds. One larva may eat several of the large seeds before reaching full growth. Full-grown larvae are 18–20 mm long and yellowish white.

Before pupating the larva constructs a silken gallery where it has been feeding, extending often through one or more beans, and it finally extends this to the outer wall of the pod, through which it eats a circular hole, except a thin layer on the outside, which can easily be broken through when the moth emerges. Then the larva recedes back into the gallery, spins a silken partition across about a quarter of an inch from the outer end, and pupates there. The pupa is about 10 mm long and light brown.

External links

Species info

Grapholitini
Endemic moths of Hawaii